Charles Marc S. De Ketelaere (born 10 March 2001) is a Belgian professional footballer who plays as an attacking midfielder for  club AC Milan and the Belgium national team.

Club career

Club Brugge 
De Ketelaere joined Club Brugge at the age of 7, also working as a ball boy. He also played tennis as a youth, but chose to pursue football.

He made his senior debut on 25 September 2019, when he played the full game in the 2019–20 Belgian Cup matchup against Francs Borains.

On 22 October 2019, he made his UEFA Champions League debut against Paris Saint-Germain. He started the game and was substituted in the 57th minute with the score of 1–0 to Paris Saint-Germain, the game eventually ended with a 5–0 loss. On 5 February 2020, he scored a goal in a 2–1 win against Zulte Waregem to reach the Belgian Cup Final.

On 20 October 2020, De Ketelaere scored the game winning goal in the 93rd minute to defeat Zenit St. Petersburg 2–1 in the group stage of the 2020–21 UEFA Champions League.

AC Milan 
On 2 August 2022, De Ketelaere joined Serie A club AC Milan on a contract until 30 June 2027.

International career
De Ketelaere was called-up for his debut in November 2020 in the Belgium team as a substitute in a loss to Switzerland. On 10 October 2021, he scored his debut international goal in the Belgium third place playoff match loss to Italy for the Nations League, 2–1.  In a 2022 FIFA World Cup match against Morocco, De Ketelaere substituted Michy Batshuayi in the 75th minute.

Personal life
As of October 2021, De Ketelaere was living with his mother.

Career statistics

Club

International

Scores and results list Belgium's goal tally first, score column indicates score after each De Ketelaere goal.

Honours
Club Brugge
 Belgian First Division A: 2019–20, 2020–21, 2021–22
 Belgian Super Cup: 2021

Individual
 Belgian Promising Talent of the Year: 2020
 Belgian Young Professional Footballer of the Year: 2021–22

References

External links

 Profile at the AC Milan website
 
 Belgium profile at Belgian FA
 

2001 births
Footballers from Bruges
Living people
Belgian footballers
Association football midfielders
Belgium international footballers
Belgium youth international footballers
Belgium under-21 international footballers
Belgian Pro League players
Serie A players
Club Brugge KV players
A.C. Milan players
2022 FIFA World Cup players
Belgian expatriate footballers
Belgian expatriate sportspeople in Italy
Expatriate footballers in Italy